Rick Dickson is in his 2nd stint as the athletic director at Tulsa. He previously served as the AD at Tulane University from 2000 through 2015. After taking over in 2000, Tulane teams have since won nine Conference USA Championships.  They have advanced to NCAA postseason play 15 times (counting three NCAA Tournament appearances each by the Green Wave women's basketball and men's tennis teams). Tulane advanced to the College World Series in 2001 and 2005. During his administration the Tulane Green Wave became a member of the American Athletic Conference, leaving Conference USA.

Dickson is a graduate of Bishop Kelley High School in Tulsa, Oklahoma and the University of Tulsa.  Prior to Tulane, he was athletic director for six years at Washington State University in Pullman. The Cougars played in their first Rose Bowl in 67 years in January 1998.

See also
Scott Cowen

References

External links
 Tulsa profile

1950s births
Living people
Place of birth missing (living people)
Sportspeople from Tulsa, Oklahoma
Tulane Green Wave athletic directors
Tulsa Golden Hurricane athletic directors
University of Tulsa alumni
Washington State Cougars athletic directors
Year of birth missing (living people)
Tulsa Golden Hurricane football players